White pear is a common name for several plants and may refer to:

Apodytes dimidiata, native to southern Africa
Pyrus × bretschneideri, the Chinese white pear